Charles Wentworth Dilke (1789–1864) was an English liberal critic and writer on literature.

Professional life 

He served for many years in the Navy Pay-Office, on retiring from which in 1830 he devoted himself to literary pursuits.

Literary life

His liberal political views and literary interests brought him into contact with Leigh Hunt, the editor of The Examiner. He had in 1814–16 made a continuation of Robert Dodsley's Collection of English Plays, and in 1829 he became part proprietor and editor of Athenaeum magazine, the influence of which he greatly extended. In 1846 he resigned the editorship, and assumed that of the Daily News, but contributed to Athenaeum papers on Alexander Pope, Edmund Burke, Junius, and others. His grandson, Sir Charles Dilke, published these writings in 1875 under the title, Papers of a Critic.

Wentworth Place

Around October 1816, Charles Wentworth Dilke and his friend Charles Armitage Brown moved into a pair of semi-detached houses later called Wentworth Place in Hampstead, London. The poet John Keats lived with Charles Brown around 1818–20 and was well known to Charles Dilke. In 1822 Charles Brown moved to Italy, selling his share of the property to Charles Dilke. Today Wentworth Place is known as Keats House and is a museum to John Keats.

Personal life

Dilke married Maria Walker (1790–1850), daughter of an official in the East India Company, on 10 October 1806. They had one child, (Charles) Wentworth Dilke (1810–1869). After her death and that of his daughter-in-law in 1853, he devoted increasing time to the upbringing of his grandson and namesake, the future cabinet minister and the 2nd Baronet.

Bibliography
Garrett, William, Charles Wentworth Dilke. Boston, Twayne, 1982.
Garrett, William, Hazlitt's Debt to C.W. Dilke. In: The Keats-Shelley Memorial Bulletin, No. XV, 1964, pp. 37–42.
Garrett, William, Two Dilke Letters. In: The Keats-Shelley Memorial Bulletin, No. XXVII, 1976, pp. 1–9.

References

Notes

External links
Biographical material
Keats House, Hampstead Dilke's former home, now a museum to Keats
 
Works
Old Plays; being a continuation of Dodsley's Collection, Vol. 1, London, 1816, at the Internet Archive. Accessed 28 March 2012
Old Plays; being a continuation of Dodsley's Collection, Vol. 2, London, 1816, at the Internet Archive. Accessed 28 March 2012
Old Plays; being a continuation of Dodsley's Collection, Vol. 3, London, 1816, at the Internet Archive. Accessed 28 March 2012
Old Plays; being a continuation of Dodsley's Collection, Vol. 4, London, 1816, at the Internet Archive. Accessed 28 March 2012
Old Plays; being a continuation of Dodsley's Collection, Vol. 5, London, 1816, at the Internet Archive. Accessed 28 March 2012
Old Plays; being a continuation of Dodsley's Collection, Vol. 6, London, 1816, at the Internet Archive. Accessed 28 March 2012
  The Papers of a Critic, Vol. I Accessed 2011-11-12
 The Papers of a Critic, Vol. II Accessed 2011-11-12
Criticism
Charles Wentworth Dilke as a Literary Critic unpublished dissertation by William Garrett, University of Florida, June 1958, at the Internet Archive. Accessed 28 March 2012

English literary critics
English magazine editors
1789 births
1864 deaths
Burials at Kensal Green Cemetery